This is an incomplete list of presidential electors in the United States presidential election of 1796.

Electoral college selection
The Constitution, in Article II, Section 1, provided that the state legislatures should decide the manner in which their Electors were chosen.  Different state legislatures chose different methods:

Maryland 
John Roberts 
John Rousby Plater 
Francis Deakins 
George Murdock 
John Lynn 
Gabriel Duvall
John Archer
John Gilpin 
John Eccleston 
John Done

Rhode Island
 Samuel J. Potter

See also 
 1796 United States presidential election

References 

 
1796